Joseph Connolly (1840–1904) was an Irish Canadian architect, born in Limerick, Ireland. He trained as an architect under James Joseph McCarthy in his native Ireland before coming to North America. Connolly specialized in Gothic Revival architecture. He is known for the churches he designed throughout Ontario, mainly for the Irish Roman Catholic community, though he also produced some industrial and residential buildings.

Biography

After completing training with James Joseph McCarthy, the 'Irish Pugin', Joseph Connolly advanced to become McCarthy's chief assistant in the 1860s and subsequently went on a study tour through Europe. He started a practice in Dublin in 1871, but moved shortly after to Toronto where he partnered with surveyor Darrin Martin, an association that lasted until 1877. From the 1880s, he worked with Arthur W. Holmes. Joseph Connolly died of bronchial asthma in 1904.

Style

Though he also designed secular buildings, Connolly is known for his Gothic Revival churches. He emulated J.J. McCarthy and George Ashlin, the most successful Roman Catholic church architects in Ireland during Connolly's formative years. His work bears some similarities to his contemporaries in Ireland such as William Hague.

Works

References

External links

Gothic Revival Architecture and Joseph Connolly
Preservation of Joseph Connolly's James Street Baptist Church in Hamilton

1840 births
1904 deaths
Architects from Limerick (city)
People from Old Toronto
19th-century Canadian architects
Gothic Revival architecture in Canada
Irish emigrants to Canada (before 1923)
Canadian ecclesiastical architects
Members of the Royal Canadian Academy of Arts